Run for the Hills is a 1953 American comedy film directed by Lew Landers and starring Sonny Tufts, Barbara Payton and Mauritz Hugo. The film's sets were designed by the art director Ernst Fegté.

Cast
 Sonny Tufts as Charlie Johnson
 Barbara Payton as Jane Johnson
 John Harmon as 	Jed Taylor
 Mauritz Hugo as 	Mr. Hudson
 Vici Raaf as Mrs. Cornish 
 Jack Wrightson as George
 Paul Maxey as Sheriff
 Harry Lewis as Mr. Carewe
 John Hamilton as Mr. Harvester
 Byron Foulger as 	Mr. Simpson
 Sid Slate as Wagstaff
 Charles Victor as Craig
 William Fawcett as Orin Hadley 
 Dee Ann Johnston as Malinda 
 George Sanders as Television Commentator
 Rosemary Colligan as Cave Girl
 Jack McElroy as Radio Announcer
 Ray Parsons as Hermit
 Michael Fox as Phineas Cragg
 Jean Willes as Frances Veach 
 Richard Benedict as 'Happy' Day
 Lester Dorr as Reporter Outside Elevator 
 Al Hill as Process Server 
 William Tannen as Charlie's Co-Worker

References

Bibliography
 Lewis, Jon. Hard-Boiled Hollywood: Crime and Punishment in Postwar Los Angeles. Univ of California Press, 2017.

External links

Run for the Hills at TCMDB

1953 films
American comedy films
1953 comedy films
American black-and-white films
Films directed by Lew Landers
1950s English-language films
1950s American films